Pitu may refer to:

People
 Adrian Pitu (born 1975), Romanian football player
 Alexi Pitu (born 2002), Romanian football player
 Kuzman Josifovski Pitu (1915–1944), Macedonian communist
 Pitu (footballer), Spanish football player
 Pitu Guli (1865–1903), Aromanian revolutionary

Places
 Pitu Airport, Indonesia

Other
 Pitu or Bambam language
 , Brazilian cachaça brand